Milan Milanović (Serbian Cyrillic: Милан Милановић; born 31 March 1991) is a Serbian professional footballer.

Career
After youth football experiences in his homeland of Serbia, Milanović moved to Russia to join Lokomotiv Moscow in 2008. In 2009, he was voted by the fans as the best player of Lokomotiv youth team, and made his professional debut in 2010 with Russian Second Division feeder club FC Lokomotiv-2 Moscow.

Palermo
In November 2010 Milanović signed a pre-contract to join Serie A club Palermo. His contract with Moscow would run out in March 2011 thus Milanović was free to negotiate contract with Palermo in November. In July 2011 he was officially included in the first team squad of Palermo, and was awarded the No. 15 jersey.

On 31 August 2011 he moved "on loan" to Siena. It is because Palermo did not wish to use its own non-EU registration quota and borrowed Siena's instead, likes Udinese registered Željko Brkić via Siena. In the document of Lega Serie A, Siena signed him from Moscow as free agent, and Siena paid Lokomotiv €270,000 as training compensation as required by FIFA regulations. His "loan" was cancelled in January 2012, and he returned to Palermo for free. Palermo also paid €1.5 million agent fee. Again, Lega Serie A documented Palermo signed Milanović from Siena outright, not a loan return, likes Brkić also "signed" outright by Udinese in January 2012, as well as Luis Muriel from Lecce to Udinese. Despite Siena released Milanović for free, Siena also signed Pablo Andrés González in temporary deal from Palermo as compensation on 31 August 2011 for €100,000. While Milanović did receive some first team call-up, but only able to play a few games for the reserve team.
Milanović made his Serie A debut on 24 March 2012, playing the full 90 minutes in a home league game against Udinese.

In January 2013 he moved on loan to Serie B club Vicenza. He returned to Palermo by the end of the season, after Vicenza's relegation to Lega Pro Prima Divisione.

Željezničar Banja Luka
In February 2019, he joined First League of the Republika Srpska club Željezničar Banja Luka until the end of the season.

References

External links
 

1991 births
Living people
Sportspeople from Mitrovica, Kosovo
Kosovo Serbs
Serbian footballers
Association football defenders
Serbia youth international footballers
Serbia under-21 international footballers
FC Lokomotiv Moscow players
Palermo F.C. players
A.C.N. Siena 1904 players
L.R. Vicenza players
Ascoli Calcio 1898 F.C. players
Pisa S.C. players
NK Triglav Kranj players
FK Radnički 1923 players
Serie A players
Serie B players
Slovenian PrvaLiga players
Serbian expatriate footballers
Expatriate footballers in Russia
Expatriate footballers in Italy
Expatriate footballers in Bosnia and Herzegovina
Expatriate footballers in Slovenia
Serbian expatriate sportspeople in Russia
Serbian expatriate sportspeople in Italy
Serbian expatriate sportspeople in Bosnia and Herzegovina
Serbian expatriate sportspeople in Slovenia